The V-League 2nd Conference is a tournament of the Shakey's V-League. The tournament began on April 22, 2006.  The tournament was won by the La Salle Lady Archers over the San Sebastian Lady Stags on July 2, 2006 two games to none.

Tournament format
Single round robin tournament
Top five teams will compete in the semi-finals
Top two teams with the best record after the double-round semi-finals will advance to the finals
Best of Three Championship series

Elimination standings

Starting Line-ups

Elimination round

Semi-finals Standings

Semi-finals

Playoff and finals

Awardees
Best Scorer - Cherry Rose Macatangay of Adamson
Best Attacker - Desiree Hernandez of La Salle
Best Blocker - Michelle Laborte of Ateneo
Best Server - Concepcion Legaspi of Lyceum
Best Setter - Relea Ferina Saet of La Salle
Best Digger - Margarita Pepito of San Sebastian
Best Receiver - Sharmaine Miles Penano of La Salle
Most Improved Player - Manilla Santos of La Salle
Finals Most Valuable Player - Jaroensri Bualee of San Sebastian
League Most Valuable Player - Cherry Rose Macatangay of Adamson

Trivia
It was La Salle's third consecutive V-League championship and has played in all four finals series.

See also

Shakey's V-League conferences
2006 in Philippine sport
2006 in volleyball